Sanhe is a town under the administration of the county-level city of Yingcheng in eastern Hubei, People's Republic of China, located  northeast of downtown Yingcheng and  northwest of Xiaogan. , it has 33 villages under its administration.

Administrative divisions
Villages:
Sanhe, Huali, Lutai, Gaolu, Tianjing, Tumen, Duimian, Shuangdun, Yihe, Caoyang, Bapeng, Yaojing, Sanjie, Yuechi, Liufen, Lizha, Weida, Xitou, Chenyuan, Liuhu, Maochong, Xuzhou, Xuliu, Yuzhang, Tuhuang, Zhouyang, Wushan, Lianghe, Zhangwang, Shuangqiao, Gaoxu, Xudun, Tangxiang

See also
List of township-level divisions of Hubei

References

Township-level divisions of Hubei
Yingcheng